Nerida Tyson-Chew (born 1965) is an Australian music composer, conductor and orchestrator, principally working in screen music. She won her first Australian Guild of Screen Composers (AGSC) Award, in 1996, for her work on  Hotel Sorrento (1995) and Brilliant Lies (1996). With Hotel Sorrento she was also nominated for an AFI Award for Best Original Music Score in 1995. In 2003 she won the Screen Music Award, co-presented by AGSC with APRA AMCOS, category Best Music for a Mini-Series or Telemovie for Evil Never Dies; in 2007 she won Best Music for a Television Series or Serial for Two Twisted, episode "Delivery Man" (2006) and she won Best Music for a Documentary for Trishna & Krishna: The Quest for Separate Lives (2009) in 2010. At the APRA Music Awards of 2020 she was acknowledged for her Distinguished Services to the Australian Screen.

Biography 

Nerida Tyson-Chew was born in 1965. She was raised in Sydney where she attended the State Conservatorium of Music, then University of Sydney for a Bachelor of Music with honours in composition. She travelled to Los Angeles to complete a Master's Degree in scoring for motion pictures and television at University of Southern California. United States composer Jerry Goldsmith was one of her teachers. When composing she uses "4 Ps : Pencil, Paper, Piano and Performer." She began her career as an orchestrator for Australian composer Bruce Rowland.<ref name="Broxton">{{cite web | url = https://moviemusicuk.us/2004/08/27/anacondas-the-hunt-for-the-blood-orchid-nerida-tyson-chew/ | title = Anacondas: The Hunt for the Blood Orchid – Nerida Tyson-Chew | last = Broxton | first = Jonathan | work = Movie Music UK  | date = 27 August 2004 | accessdate = 15 December 2020 }}</ref>

Tyson-Chew gained wide-spread recognition for screen music composition on her first feature film, Hotel Sorrento (1995), which was directed by Richard Franklin. In the following year she worked on Franklin's next film, Brilliant Lies. She won her first Australian Guild of Screen Composers (AGSC) Award, in 1996, 
in the category Best Music for a Children's Television Series for the two films. She had also received a nomination for the AFI Award for Best Original Music Score for Hotel Sorrento in 1995. Her third film with Franklin, One Way Ticket (1997), was a made-for-television drama. The composer collaborated with the director on most of his subsequent projects – he also provided lyrics for some of her tunes.

She was profiled by Connections writer, Madeleine Murray, who described the composer's process for the drama film, Under the Lighthouse Dancing (October 1997). Tyson-Chew typically starts with a description from a film's director (in this case, Graham Rattigan) and on her grand piano in her suburban home she writes the themes and melodies, some for an entire orchestra (Melbourne Symphony Orchestra). She provides the rough version for the director's approval and then plans the recording schedule for the orchestra, which she conducts. Her music is written to precise lengths to fit the film's time codes for each scene. For her work on Under the Lighthouse Dancing, Twisted Tales (1996–1997) and Fern Gully 2, she won Best Original Music in a TV Series or Film at the AGSC Awards of 1997. At the 1999 ceremony she won the Best Original Music in a TV Series or Serial, shared with Garry McDonald and Lawrence Stone, for their work on The Lost World (1999).

Yahoo Serious' film Mr. Accident (2000) was scored by Tyson-Chew. From 2002 AGSC combined with APRA AMCOS to provide the Screen Music Awards. At the 2003 ceremony she won Best Music for a Mini-Series or Telemovie for Evil Never Dies. For Trishna & Krishna: The Quest for Separate Lives she won Best Music for a Documentary in 2010. She won another Best Music for Children's Television in 2018 for The Deep episode, "The Missing". At the APRA Music Awards of 2020 in December she was acknowledged for her Distinguished Services to the Australian Screen, which recognised her long-term career as a composer in diverse forms including film, TV dramas, children's programmes and documentaries.

 Awards and nominations 

 AGSC Awards 

The Australian Guild of Screen Composers (AGSC) sponsored the AGSC Awards from 1996 to 2000.

!
|-
| 1996 || Hotel Sorrento, Brilliant Lies || Best Music for a Children's Television Series ||  ||rowspan="3"| 
|-
| 1997 || Twisted Tales, Under the Lighthouse Dancing, Fern Gully 2 || Best Original Music in a TV Series || 
|-
| 1999 || The Lost World || Best Original Music in a TV Series or Serial || 
|-

 APRA Music Awards 

Since 2002 AGSC has collaborated with APRA AMCOS to sponsor the Screen Music Awards at an annual ceremony as part of the APRA Music Awards to honour "compositions for documentaries, short films, mini-series, children's television and feature film scores." From 1992 to 2001 APRA AMCOS had provided two screen music-based categories, Best Television Theme and Best Film Score, at their annual ceremonies.

!
|-
| 2000 || The Adventures of Sam || Best Television Theme ||  || 
|-
| 2003 || Evil Never Dies || Best Music for a Mini-Series or Telemovie ||  || 
|-
|rowspan="2"| 2005 || Tracey McBean – "Galaxy Blazers" || Best Music for Children's Television ||  ||rowspan="2"| 
|-
| Anacondas: The Hunt for the Blood Orchid || Best Soundtrack Album || 
|-
| 2006 || Tracey McBean || Best Music for Children's Television ||  || 
|-
|rowspan="3"| 2007 || Life || Best Music for a Documentary ||  || 
|-
| Two Twisted – "Delivery Man" || Best Music for a Television Series or Serial ||  || 
|-
| Two Twisted || Best Television Theme ||  || 
|-
| 2009 || The Stamp of Australia || Best Television Theme ||  || 
|-
|rowspan="2"| 2010 || Trishna & Krishna: The Quest for Separate Lives || Best Music for a Documentary ||  ||rowspan="2"| 
|-
| Rescue: Special Ops, "Series 1, Episode 1" || Best Music for a Television Series or Serial || 
|-
| 2012 || Santa's Apprentice || Feature Film Score of the Year ||  || 
|-
|rowspan="2"| 2017 || Herself || Most Performed Screen Composer – Overseas ||  || 
|-
| The Deep: "Tartaruga" || Best Music for Children's Television ||  || 
|-
| 2018 || The Deep'': "The Missing" || Best Music for Children's Television ||  || 
|-
| 2019 || Herself || Most Performed Screen Composer – Overseas ||  || 
|-
|rowspan="2"| 2020 || Herself || Most Performed Screen Composer – Overseas ||  ||rowspan="2"| 
|-
| Herself || Distinguished Services to the Australian Screen || 
|-

Australian Women in Music Awards
The Australian Women in Music Awards is an annual event that celebrates outstanding women in the Australian Music Industry who have made significant and lasting contributions in their chosen field. They commenced in 2018.

|-
| 2018
| Nerida Tyson-Chew
| Musical Excellence Award
|

References 

1965 births
APRA Award winners
Australian film score composers
Living people